Degan may refer to:
 Degan (surname), an anglicised Irish-language surname
 Degan of Treves (c. 800–850), Frankish Roman Catholic prelate
 Degan, Ethiopia, a town in Kalu (woreda), Ethiopia
 Degan Subdistrict, in Jiangjin District, China
 Degan, Churu, a village in India

See also
 Degan Elementary School, an American public elementary school

 Degen (disambiguation)